Robert Arthur Grove (March 17, 1923 – May 25, 1984) was an American professional basketball player. He played for the Hammond Calumet Buccaneers in the National Basketball League for one game during the 1948–49 season, among several other teams in various leagues.

References

1923 births
1984 deaths
United States Army personnel of World War II
American men's basketball players
Basketball players from Indiana
Guards (basketball)
Hammond Calumet Buccaneers players
People from Daviess County, Indiana
Professional Basketball League of America players
Toledo Rockets men's basketball players